Vernier may refer to:

Vernier, Switzerland
Vernier (surname)
Pierre Vernier, French mathematician and inventor of the Vernier scale
Vernier scale, a secondary measuring device
Vernier thruster, a secondary control mechanism on spacecraft
Vernier throttle, a secondary control mechanism on aircraft
Vernier Software & Technology, an educational technology supplier
Vernier acuity, a type of visual acuity

See also
Marais-Vernier
Veneer (disambiguation)